Zetesima is a moth genus of the family Depressariidae.

Species
 Zetesima lasia Walsingham, 1912
 Zetesima portentosa Busck, 1914

References

Stenomatinae